Caprauna is a comune (municipality) in the Province of Cuneo in the Italian region Piedmont, located about  south of Turin and about  southeast of Cuneo.

Caprauna borders the following municipalities: Alto, Aquila di Arroscia, Armo, Borghetto d'Arroscia, Ormea, and Pieve di Teco.

References

See also 
 Monte Armetta
 Monte della Guardia

Cities and towns in Piedmont